The 2018 Team Bath netball season saw Team Bath finish fourth  in the 2018 Netball Superleague regular season. They subsequently lost to Wasps in a play-off semi-final. During their pre-season, Team Bath also played in the inaugural Fast5 Netball All-Stars Championship and finished as runners up after losing the final to Loughborough Lightning.

Squad

Preseason

Fast5 Netball All-Stars Championship
On 24 September 2017, Team Bath played in the inaugural Fast5 Netball All-Stars Championship. Team Bath reached the final but lost to Loughborough Lightning.
Double Elimination Stage

Semi-final

Final

Tri-Tournament
On 6 January 2018 Team Bath hosted and won a three team tournament which also featured Severn Stars and Wasps. The tournament was broadcast live on BBC Sport.

Mike Greenwood Trophy
Team Bath played three games at the 2018 Mike Greenwood Trophy tournament but failed to register a win. Traditionally a pre-season tournament, the 2018 event, was switched to April this season to act as a warm-up for the restart of the 2018 Netball Superleague season, following the five-week Commonwealth Games break.

Regular season

Fixtures and results

Final table

Playoffs

Semi-final

Team Bath end-of-season awards

References

2018 Netball Superleague season
2018